The Illawarriors are a rugby union franchise based in the Illawarra, New South Wales, Australia controlled by the Illawarra Rugby Union. 

They currently compete in the New South Wales Country Rugby Union championship. They play their home matches out of WIN Stadium.

Rugby union teams in New South Wales
Sports teams in Wollongong
Rugby clubs established in 2006
2006 establishments in Australia